The 1988 NCAA Division I Indoor Track and Field Championships were contested March 14−15, 1986 at the Myriad Convention Center in Oklahoma City, Oklahoma to determine the individual and team national champions of men's and women's NCAA collegiate indoor track and field events in the United States. These were the 24th annual men's championships and the 6th annual women's championships.

Four-time defending champions Arkansas claimed the men's team title, the Razorbacks' fifth overall title and, ultimately, the fifth of twelve straight titles for Arkansas.

In the women's championship, meanwhile, Texas claimed their second overall team title and second in three years.

Qualification
All teams and athletes from Division I indoor track and field programs were eligible to compete for this year's individual and team titles.

Team standings 
 Note: Top 10 only
 Scoring: 6 points for a 1st-place finish in an event, 4 points for 2nd, 3 points for 3rd, 2 points for 4th, and 1 point for 5th
 (DC) = Defending Champions
 Full results

Men's title

Women's title

References

NCAA Indoor Track and Field Championships
Ncaa Indoor Track And Field Championships
Ncaa Indoor Track And Field Championships
NCAA Indoor Track and Field Championships